Kenneth L. Kantor is an audio designer and businessman who co-founded the Now Hear This (NHT) speaker company.

Psychoacoustics (the human perception of sound) were of particular interest to Kantor, and this became the underpinnings of much of the design work he has done for several companies.

Career
In 1986 Kantor co-founded and became executive vice president of Now Hear This (NHT), a successful speaker company, based on "Focused Image Geometry", a fundamental new psycho-acoustic technology.  He played a key role in formulation of the business, marketing and product development efforts.  Other designs include the SuperZero, the first affordable, high end bookshelf speaker; the industry's first complete, matched home theater system; and a patent for in-ceiling loudspeakers that dramatically improved off-axis frequency response.  In 1990 NHT was sold to International Jensen, where Kantor was promoted to Vice President of Technology.

Kantor founded ZT Amplifiers, a musical instrument amplifier company. ZT uses proprietary DSP and amplifier technologies in a product line it imports from China.

References

http://www.stereophile.com/interviews/232/
http://www.soundstage.com/revequip/nht_a20.htm
http://www.stereophile.com/floorloudspeakers/1293nht/
http://www.wired.com/science/discoveries/news/2006/08/71480
http://www.onhifi.com/product/nht_m00.htm
Ken Kantor, "DSP In Audio Technology: The Promise, Reality and Future of Digital Signal Processing." Audio Magazine, Dec 1996.
Ken Kantor, "50 Years of Loudspeakers." Audio Magazine, May 1997.

External links
kenkantor.com - official personal site
ztamplifiers.com
tymphany.com
nhthifi.com - Now Hear This official site
acoustic-research.com - Acoustic Research official site
Ken Kantor Interview - NAMM Oral History Library (2013)

American acoustical engineers
Living people
Year of birth missing (living people)